Psilocerea psegma is a species of moth of the family Geometridae. It is found on the Comoros.

Related pages
List of moths of the Comoros

References
De Prins, J. & De Prins, W. 2015. Afromoths, online database of Afrotropical moth species (Lepidoptera). World Wide Web electronic publication (www.afromoths.net) (13.Mar.2015)
Herbulot, C. 1981a. Mission P. Viette à la grande Comore. Lepidoptera Geometridae. - Bulletin de la Société entomologique de France 85 (1980)(11–12):266–273

Ennominae
Moths described in 1981